Elizabeth Ann Keller (born June 25, 1978) is an American soccer player who last played for the Carolina Courage in the Women's United Soccer Association.

High school career
She played on the men's varsity soccer team at Hilton Head Island High School in South Carolina and was elected to Parade Magazine's All-American Girls Soccer Team in 1996.

Professional career
Keller played for the US Women's National Team (USWNT) in 1998 and 1999. She played with the US U-21 Team and won the 1999 Nordic Cup in Iceland. She played for the Chicago Cobras and was invited to the inaugural Women's United Soccer Association combine. She was drafted to the Philadelphia Charge and later played for the Carolina Courage.

Personal life
Keller majored in political science and history at Clemson University.

References

External links
 WUSA statistics

United States women's international soccer players
Clemson University alumni
University of Utah alumni
Living people
1978 births
American women's soccer players
Clemson Tigers women's soccer players
Women's association football midfielders
Women's association football forwards
Chicago Cobras players
USL W-League (1995–2015) players
Philadelphia Charge players
Carolina Courage players
Women's United Soccer Association players